Survival of the Thickest is an upcoming  comedy-drama television series created by Michelle Buteau and Danielle Sanchez Witzel for Netflix, based on a memoir of the same name. Developed by Sanchez, the series follows Mavis Beaumont (Michelle Buteau), a plus-sized African-American woman who recently got over from a breakup. In an attempt to rebuild her life, she finds unexpected obstacles along the way. The series is expected to launch globally on the streaming platform.

Premise 
Recently turned single black woman, Mavis Beaumont, attempts to rebuild her life after "putting all of her eggs in one man's basket". As a struggling stylist, she is about to face various hurdles ahead as she tries to get herself together. Alongside her friends and relatives, she tries to survive and break through her problems, career and relationship-wise, with her "body-positive attitude, cute v-neck, and some lip-gloss".

Cast 

 Michelle Buteau as Mavis Beaumont
 Tone Bell as Khalil
 Tasha Smith as Marley
 Garcelle Beauvais as Natasha
 Anissa Felix as India
 Peppermint as Peppermint
 Taylor Selé as Jacque
 Marouane Zotti as Luca
 Michelle Visage as Avery
 Sarah Cooper as Sydney
 Anthony Michael Lopez as Bruce 
 Liza Treyger as Jade
 Allan K. Washington as Trent

Production

Development 
On January 24, 2022, Netflix announced an eight-episode television adaptation of Michelle Buteau's autobiographical essays Survival of the Thickest, with Buteau and Danielle Sanchez-Witzel served as co-creators and executive producers. Witzel, who previously developed The Carmichael Show and co-produced New Girl, was revealed as the showrunner of the television series as part of her multi-year deal with Netflix. Alongside Buteau and Sanchez, Ravi Nandan and Alli Reich of A24 would join as co-executive producers. On August 31, 2022, Anne Hong from Mosaic was unveiled as co-executive producer. Meanwhile, Linda Mendoza was announced to be one of the series directors, having directed the first two episodes of the series.

Casting 

Michelle Buteau was announced as main lead on January 24, 2022 alongside the television series announcement. On August 31, 2022, Tone Bell and Tasha Smith joined alongside Buteau, as the main casts of the series. On October 7, 2022, it was unveiled that Garcelle Beauvais, Anissa Felix, Peppermint, Taylor Selé, and Marouane Zotti joined the main cast in recurring roles. Additionally, on October 18, 2022, Michelle Visage, Sarah Cooper, Anthony Michael Lopez, Liza Treyger, and Allan K Washington were revealed to have joined the cast.

Filming 
Principal photography of the series reportedly started on September 26, 2022, with New York revealed as one of the shooting locations. The filming reportedly concluded on November 20, 2022.

References

External links 

 

Upcoming Netflix original programming
2020s American black television series
American black television series
American comedy-drama television series
English-language television shows
Television series based on actual events
Television series by A24